Kahan may refer to

Places 
 Kahan, a village and tehsil in Balochistan, Pakistan
 Kahan, Iran, a village in Razavi Khorasan Province, Iran
 Kahan, Isfahan, a village in Isfahan Province, Iran
 Kahan-e Pain, a village in Razavi Khorasan Province, Iran

Other uses 
 William Kahan, Canadian mathematician
 Kahan summation algorithm, a mathematical algorithm attributed to William Kahan
 Yitzhak Kahan, 6th President of the Supreme Court of Israel 
 Kahan Commission, an Israeli investigation into the Sabra and Shatila Massacre in Lebanon

See also 
 Kahane, a surname (including a list of people)
 Kahanism
 Cahan (disambiguation)

Kohenitic surnames